The Petit Véhicule Protégé ("Small Protected vehicle") is a light, general-purpose armoured 4-wheel drive vehicle used by the French Army, made by Panhard. It is also designated as Auverland A4 AVL (Armoured Vehicle Light).  Built by Auverland, it is one of the successors to the Peugeot P4.

It's intended mostly as personnel carrier, weapon carrier, and for reconnaissance, detection and communications purposes.

History
In 2004, the first batch of 314 vehicles was ordered. The first vehicles were delivered in February 2008 and production ended in July 2012. 100 vehicles will be fitted with the WASP light RWS. It is expected that the French DGA will order an additional 300 PVP vehicles.

The 2009-14 military budget originally called for a total of 1500 PVPs, but this was reduced to 1233 in 2010 and 1133 in 2012. In the end, 1073 were delivered to the Army at a total cost of €242.7m (~US$325m) for a unit cost of €167,000 (~US$220,000), or €226,000 (~US$300,000) including development costs.

Design
The PVP is modular, allowing extra seats to be added for more personnel, or to be used as a light truck. The armour, made of steel and aluminium, offers level 2 protection (STANAG 4569) for the crew and the engine. The floor is protected against antipersonnel mines (type DM 31).

Variants
 PVP HD (Heavy Duty) – larger version, based on the same architecture but with level 3 armour. With 5 doors and more cargo area (2T payload, total internal volume of 7.9 m³). Gross vehicle weight is 7.6 tonnes.
 PVP XL (Extra Large) – with a total internal volume of 9.4 m³ and a gross vehicle weight of 12 tonnes (max. payload: 3 tonnes). The maximum number of seats is 10. The basic armour of the XL model also offers a level 3 protection.
 PVP APC – Based on the French Army's PVP but with a 150mm higher roofline to provide room for 6 troops. Developed in 2010.
 Gavial – Unbuilt 5-door version with pneumatic suspension, to be licence-built by Rheinmetall. Offered to the Bundeswehr but they chose the LAPV Enok instead.
 Colt – License-built by Ashok Leyland, first revealed in 2012. Variants of the original PVP as the Colt Light Tactical Vehicle, the PVP HD as the Colt Light Armoured Vehicle and the Colt Airmobile.

Operators 

 – 15 PVP delivered (Chilean Marines and Grupo de Operaciones Policiales Especiales)
 – 1073 PVP delivered for the French Army and French police elite unit RAID
 - Said to operate an unknown number of PVPs.
 – 16 PVP delivered from 2012–15.
 – 6 PVPs delivered in 2008 for Togolese forces deployed with MINURCAT.

References

External links 

 PVP A4 AVL Data Sheet
 Photographs of the Petit Véhicule Protégé, French Ministry of Defence.
 Petit Véhicule Protégé on defense-update.com
 Auverland A4 AVL

Military trucks
Panhard military vehicles
Armoured cars of France
Armoured personnel carriers of France
Military vehicles introduced in the 2000s